Saint Zayya (Syriac: ܡܪܝ ܙܝܥܐ), was a travelling mystic, holy man and healer who made his way from Palestine to the mountains of northern Mesopotamia and Assyria spreading Christianity with his disciple St. Tawor. The Church of the East honours both Zayya and St. Tawor for their missionary efforts in northern Iraq and the region of Upper Dasen (modern Hakkâri province, Turkey) during the late 4th and early 5th centuries. He is also the patron saint of travellers and the Jilu district, where he is buried, and is invoked for protection from hail, famine, plague, anger, illness, disease and the Angel of Death. Zayya is often depicted in miniatures from manuscripts of the Book of Protection as an equestrian saint, spear in hand, and attacking the Angel of Death.

Tradition and legend

Death and remains

Veneration

According to the calendar of the Church of the East, the birth of St. Zay'ā is celebrated on May 26, and a three-day rogation (fast) precedes the commemoration of his death on the first Wednesday of January.

Traditionally, the Assyrians of Jilu celebrate the Feast (Syriac: Shahrā) of St. Zay'ā on September 13 every year on the Feast of the Cross. The reason given for this is that the Saint's other festivals fell on dates when the weather was too cold for pilgrims to be able to travel to the main shrine for the celebration. Often, the Jilu District was snowed in for six months of the year. Holding the Saint's Feast day on September 13, when the weather was more agreeable, not only meant that they could take advantage of the brighter light of moon at night, it also meant that those Jīlū men who planned on travelling before the first snows could pray for a safe and successful journey and make their vows to the Saint before departing.

Other feasts to the Saint are also celebrated by the Assyrians of Arbūsh (Tell-'Arbush) and Halmon (Tell-Jum'ah) in the Khabur district of Syria, as well as by Assyrians from the Amadiya district of Iraq, and some Assyrians from the Urmia region of Iran.

A prayer commonly attributed to St. Zay'ā is:

This prayer appears in a shorter form in the Saint's Vita, and also in different versions of the Book of Protection, from which amulets and talismans were copied.

Shrines

 Turkey
 
Sts. Zay'ā and Tāwor Cathedral (Abandoned - Assyrian Church of the East), Mātā d-‘Umrā d-Mār Zay'ā, Jilu (present-day Çevrecik, Hakkari province, Turkey)

 Iraq
St. Zay'ā Cathedral (Assyrian Church of the East), Mechanics’ Quarter, Dora, Baghdad
St. Zay'ā Church (Assyrian Church of the East), Sardarāwā, Sarsing District, Duhok Governorate
St. Zay'ā Cave-Shrine, Duhoké, Sarsing District, Duhok Governorate
St. Zay'ā Church (now a Mosque), 'Aqdish (Kādish), Amadiya District, Duhok Governorate
St. Zay'ā Cathedral (Ruined - Assyrian Church of the East), Karrādat Maryam, Baghdad
St. Zay'ā Church (Ruined - Assyrian Church of the East), Kamp al-Sikak (“Jilu Camp”), Baghdad
St. Zay'ā Church (Ruined – Assyrian Church of the East), Khirsheniyah, Simel District, Duhok Governorate
St. Zay'ā Church (Ruined - Chaldean Catholic Church), M‘althāyé (Malta Nasara), Duhok District, Duhok Governorate

 Iran
 
St. Zay'ā Cathedral (Assyrian Church of the East), Geogtāpā, Urmia County, West Azerbaijan Province
St. Zay'ā Church (Assyrian Church of the East), Hassar d-Spurghān, Urmia County, West Azerbaijan Province
St. Zay'ā Church (Chaldean Catholic Church), Khosrāwā, Salmas County, West Azerbaijan Province

 Syria
St. Zay'ā Church (New – Assyrian Church of the East), Tell-Gorān, Al-Hasakah Governorate
St. Zay'ā Church (Old – Assyrian Church of the East), Tell-Gorān, Al-Hasakah Governorate
St. Zay'ā Church (Chaldean Catholic Church), Tell-Sāameh, Al-Hasakah Governorate

 Lebanon
St. Zay'ā Church (Assyrian Church of the East), Ksārā, Zahlé District, Beqaa Governorate

 Australia
St. Zaia Cathedral (Ancient Church of the East) West Hoxton, NSW

 U.S.A.
St. Zaia Cathedral (Assyrian Church of the East), Modesto, CA

 Canada
St. Zaia Church (Assyrian Church of the East), London, ON

 India
St. Ziah Church (Assyrian Church of the East - Chaldean Syrian Church), Palakkad (Palghat), Thrissur District, Kerala

References

See also
 Jilu
 Saints days
 Syriac Christianity
 Church of the East
 Assyrian Church of the East
 Ancient Church of the East
 Chaldean Catholic Church

4th-century Christian saints
Saints from the Holy Land
Assyrian Church of the East saints
Syriac Christianity
Assyrian Church of the East
Chaldean Catholic Church
Mesopotamian saints
History of Christianity in Turkey
Hakkâri Province
309 births
431 deaths
Nestorians
Angelic visionaries